William Farnum (July 4, 1876 – June 5, 1953) was an American actor. He was a star of American silent cinema, and became one of the highest-paid actors during that time.

Biography
Farnum was born on July 4, 1876, in Boston, Massachusetts, but he grew up in Bucksport, Maine.

One of three brothers, Farnum grew up in a family of actors. He made his acting debut at the age of 10 in Richmond, Virginia, in a production of Julius Caesar, with Edwin Booth playing the title character.

He portrayed the title character of Ben-Hur (1900) on Broadway. Later plays Farnum appeared in there included The Prince of India (1906), The White Sister (1909), The Littlest Rebel (1911) co-starring his brother Dustin, and Arizona (1913), also with Dustin. 

In The Spoilers in 1914, Farnum and Tom Santschi staged a classic film fight which lasted for a full reel. In 1930, Farnum and Santschi coached Gary Cooper and William Boyd in the fight scene for the 1930 version of The Spoilers. Other actors influenced by the Farnum/Santschi scene were Milton Sills and Noah Beery in 1923 and Randolph Scott and John Wayne in 1942.

From 1915 to 1952, Farnum devoted his life to motion pictures. While becoming one of the most popular actors in Hollywood, he also became one of the highest-paid, earning $10,000 a week. Farnum's silent pictures Drag Harlan (1920) and If I Were King (1921) survive from his years contracted to Fox Films. Nearly all of Fox's silent films made before 1932 were destroyed in a vault fire in 1937.

Personal life
Married three times, Farnum was the father of screenwriter Dorothy Farnum with Mabel Eaton.  He had a daughter, Sara Adele, with his second wife, Olive White. He had three children with his third wife, Isabelle, named Isabelle, Elizabeth, and William Farnum Jr.

Farnum died from uremia and cancer on June 5, 1953 at Cedars of Lebanon Hospital. He is interred at Forest Lawn Memorial Park in Glendale, California.

On February 8, 1960, Farnum received a star on the Hollywood Walk of Fame for his contributions to the motion-picture industry at 6322 Hollywood Boulevard.

He was the younger brother of major film actor Dustin Farnum. He had another brother, Marshall Farnum, who was a silent film director, who died in 1917.

Filmography

Silent

The Redemption of David Corson (1914, Short) as David Corson
The Spoilers (1914) as Roy Glenister
The Sign of the Cross (1914, extant; Library of Congress) as Marcus Superbus
Samson (1915) as Maurice Brachard
A Gilded Fool (1915) as Chauncey Short
The Governor (1915) as Philip Morrow
The Plunderer (1915) as Bill Matthews
The Wonderful Adventure (1915) as Martin Stanley / Wilton Demarest
The Broken Law (1915) as Daniel Esmond - later Known as Lavengro
A Soldier's Oath (1915) as Pierre Duval
Fighting Blood (1916) as Lem Hardy
The Bondman (1916) as Stephen Orry / Jason Orry
A Man of Sorrow (1916) as Jack Hewlitt
The Battle of Hearts (1916) as Martin Cane
The Man from Bitter Roots (1916) as Bruce Burt
The End of the Trail (1916) as Jules Le Clerq
The Fires of Conscience (1916) as George Baxter
The Price of Silence (1917) as Senator Frank Deering
A Tale of Two Cities (1917) as Charles Darnay / Sydney Carton
American Methods (1917) as William Armstrong
The Conqueror (1917) as Sam Houston
When a Man Sees Red (1917) as Larry Smith
Les Misérables (1917) as Jean Valjean
The Heart of a Lion (1917) as Barney Kemper
 The Scarlet Car (1917) as Billy Winthrop
Rough and Ready (1918) as Bill Stratton
True Blue (1918) as Bob McKeever
Riders of the Purple Sage (1918) as Lassiter
The Rainbow Trail (1918) as Lassiter / Shefford
For Freedom (1918) as Robert Wayne
The Man Hunter (1919) as George Arnold
The Jungle Trail (1919) as Robert Morgan
The Lone Star Ranger (1919) as Steele
Wolves of the Night (1919) as Bruce Andrews
The Last of the Duanes (1919) as Buck Duane
Wings of the Morning (1919) as Capt. Robert Anstruther / Robert Jenks
Heart Strings (1920) as Pierre Fournel
The Adventurer (1920) as Don Caesar de Bazan
The Orphan (1920) as The Orphan
The Joyous Troublemaker (1920) as William Steele
If I Were King (1920) as François Villon
Drag Harlan (1920) as Drag Harlan
The Scuttlers (1920) as Jim Landers
His Greatest Sacrifice (1921) as Richard Hall
Perjury (1921) as Robert Moore
A Stage of Romance (1922) as Edmund Kean (Character)
Shackles of Gold (1922) as John Gibbs
Moonshine Valley (1922) as Ned Connors
Without Compromise (1922) as Dick Leighton
Brass Commandments (1923) as Stephen 'Flash' Lanning
The Gunfighter (1923) as Billy Buell
The Man Who Fights Alone (1924) as John Marble
Tropical Nights (1928)

Sound

The Spoilers (1930) as Fight Spectator (uncredited)
Du Barry, Woman of Passion (1930) as Louis XV
The Painted Desert (1931) as Cash Holbrook
Ten Nights in a Barroom (1931) as Joe Morgan
A Connecticut Yankee (1931) as King Arthur / Inventor
The Pagan Lady (1931) as Malcolm 'Mal' Todd
Law of the Sea (1931) as Captain Len Andrews
The Drifter (1932) as The Drifter
Mr. Robinson Crusoe (1932) as William Belmont
Flaming Guns (1932) as Henry Ramsey
Supernatural (1933) as Nick 'Nicky' Hammond
Fighting with Kit Carson (1933, Serial) as Elliott (Ch. 1)
Another Language (1933) as C. Forrester (uncredited)
Marriage on Approval (1933) as Reverend John MacDougall
Good Dame (1934) as Judge Flynn
School for Girls (1934) as Charles Waltham
Are We Civilized? (1934) as Paul Franklin, Sr.
The Count of Monte Cristo (1934) as Captain Leclere
Happy Landing (1934) as Col. Curtis
The Scarlet Letter (1934) as Gov. Bellingham
Cleopatra (1934) as Lepidus
The Brand of Hate (1934) as Joe Larkins
The Silver Streak (1934) as Barney J. Dexter
Million Dollar Haul (1935) as Mr. Mallory - Sheila's Dad
The Crusades (1935) as Hugo - Duke of Burgundy
Powdersmoke Range (1935) as Sam Oreham - Banker
The Eagle's Brood (1935) as El Toro
Between Men (1935) as John Wellington - aka Rand
The Irish Gringo (1935) as Pop Wiley
The Fighting Coward (1935) as Jim Horton
Custer's Last Stand (1936, Serial) as James Fitzpatrick
The Kid Ranger (1936) as Bill Mason
The Clutching Hand (1936, Serial) as Gordon Gaunt
Undersea Kingdom (1936, Serial) as Sharad
Hollywood Boulevard (1936) as Minor Role (scenes deleted)
The Vigilantes Are Coming (1936, Serial) as Father José
Maid of Salem (1937) as Crown Justice Sewall
Git Along Little Dogies (1937) as Mr. Maxwell
Public Cowboy No. 1 (1937) as Sheriff Matt Doniphon
The Lone Ranger (1938, Serial) as Father McKim
If I Were King (1938) as General Barbezier
Santa Fe Stampede (1938) as Dave Carson
Shine On, Harvest Moon (1938) as Milt Brower
Mexicali Rose (1939) as Padre Dominic
Should Husbands Work? (1939) as Friend (uncredited)
Colorado Sunset (1939) as Sheriff George Glenn
Rovin' Tumbleweeds (1939) as Senator Timothy Nolan
South of the Border (1939) as Padre
Convicted Woman (1940) as Commissioner McNeill
Adventures of Red Ryder (1940, Serial) as Colonel Tom Ryder [Ch. 1]
Kit Carson (1940) as Don Miguel Murphy
Hi-Yo Silver (1940) as Father McKim (archive footage)
The Villain Still Pursued Her (1940) as Vagabond (uncredited)
Cheers for Miss Bishop (1941) as Judge Peters
A Woman's Face (1941) as Court Attendant
Gangs of Sonora (1941) as Ward Beecham
Last of the Duanes (1941) as Texas Ranger Major McNeil
The Corsican Brothers (1941) as Priest
Today I Hang (1942) as Warden Burke
The Lone Star Ranger (1942) as Texas Ranger Major McNeil
The Spoilers (1942) as Wheaton
Men of Texas (1942) as General Sam Houston
The Silver Bullet (1942) as Dr. Thad Morgan
Boss of Hangtown Mesa (1942) as Judge Ezra Binns
Tish (1942) as John (uncredited)
Deep in the Heart of Texas (1942) as Colonel Mallory
American Empire (1942) as Louisiana Judge
Tennessee Johnson (1942) as Senator Huyler
Calaboose (1943) as Checkers Player (uncredited)
Prairie Chickens (1943) as Cache Lake Townsman (uncredited)
Hangmen Also Die! (1943) as Viktorin (uncredited)
Frontier Badmen (1943) as Dad Courtwright
The Mummy's Curse (1944) as Sacristan
Wildfire (1945) as Judge Polson
Captain Kidd (1945) as Capt. Rawson
God's Country (1946) as Sandy McTavish
Rolling Home (1946) as Rodeo Official
My Dog Shep (1946) as Carter J. Latham
The Perils of Pauline (1947) as Western Saloon Set Hero
Heaven Only Knows (1947) as Gabriel (uncredited)
Daughter of the West (1949) as Father Vallejo
Bride of Vengeance (1949) as Conti Peruzzi
Samson and Delilah (1949) as Tubal
Gun Cargo (1949) as Board of Inquiry Chairman
Trail of Robin Hood (1950) as Bill Franum
Hollywood Story (1951) as Himself
Lone Star (1952) as Senator Tom Crockett
Jack and the Beanstalk (1952) as The King (final film role)

References

External links

William Farnum at Virtual History
Bill Farnum at the end of his theater career and start of his movie career(moviecard)
 shipboard portrait of Mrs. William Farnum(Olive White) and daughter Adele Farnum

1876 births
1953 deaths
American male film actors
American male silent film actors
Vaudeville performers
Deaths from cancer in California
Male actors from Boston
Male Western (genre) film actors
20th-century American male actors
Burials at Forest Lawn Memorial Park (Glendale)
20th Century Studios contract players